The 5th constituency of Yvelines is a French legislative constituency in the Yvelines département.

Description

The 5th constituency of Yvelines is one of a group of constituencies within the department formed from the wealthy western suburbs of Paris. The seat includes Maisons-Laffitte to the west of the Seine and Sartrouville on the eastern side.

Until 2017 the constituency consistently returned conservatives to the National Assembly. Its former representative Jacques Myard first won the seat in 1993.  In both 2002 and 2007 he won over 50% of the vote in the first round thus negating the need for a second round run off.

Historic Representation

Election results

2022

 
 
 
 
 
 
 
 
|-
| colspan="8" bgcolor="#E9E9E9"|
|-

2017

 
 
 
 
 
 
|-
| colspan="8" bgcolor="#E9E9E9"|
|-

2012

 
 
 
 
 
 
|-
| colspan="8" bgcolor="#E9E9E9"|
|-

2007

 
 
 
 
 
 
 
|-
| colspan="8" bgcolor="#E9E9E9"|
|-

2002

 
 
 
 
 
 
 
|-
| colspan="8" bgcolor="#E9E9E9"|
|-
 
 

 
 
 
 
 

* Withdrew before the 2nd round

1997

 
 
 
 
 
 
 
|-
| colspan="8" bgcolor="#E9E9E9"|
|-

Sources
Official results of French elections from 2002: "Résultats électoraux officiels en France" (in French).

5